PromoJam is a social media marketing technology platform for businesses to build, launch and track promotions that reach new customers on the popular social networks. PromoJam utilizes word-of-mouth marketing and peer to peer recommendations to help drive customer acquisition.

History
PromoJam is a social media marketing technology founded in June, 2009. PromoJam was developed to help brands maximize their online visibility and social media reach through social media promotions. PromoJam originated as a Twitter-only promotion builder platform, and has since expanded its service to include Facebook, MySpace and Tumblr social network integrations. In 2011, PromoJam released PromoJam-GO!, a mobile social media marketing platform that utilizes QR codes to engage offline and online consumers.

Service
There are two service levels — PromoJam Do It Yourself, which runs Twitter promotions, and PromoJam Enterprise, which runs promotions across a variety of social media networks.

To date, PromoJam has reached over 80 million social network users.

Company
PromoJam is developed and owned by parent company, CultureJam, Inc. and is based out of Venice, California. CultureJam was founded by Matt MacNaughton and Amanda MacNaughton in 2008. PromoJam received $1.2m fund in a Series A round by Golden Seeds in March 2012.

Further reading

 "Twitter insists it won't abandon developers"

References

External links
 
 Fresh Engagements

Internet properties established in 2009